The following lists events that happened in 1937 in Iceland.

Incumbents
Monarch - Kristján X
Prime Minister – Hermann Jónasson

Events

Births

8 February – Skúli Níelsen, footballer
17 March – Páll Bragi Pétursson, politician.(d. 2020)
22 March – Edvard Júlíus Sólnes, politician.
14 April – Jón Stefánsson, footballer (d. 1964)
20 April – Jakob Jakobsson, footballer
13 June – Heimir Guðjónsson, footballer
19 June – Björn S. Stefánsson, social scientist
28 August – Birgir Sigurðsson, writer (d. 2019)
1 September – Sveinn Jónsson, footballer

Deaths
28 November – Magnús Guðmundsson, politician (b. 1879).

References

 
1930s in Iceland
Iceland
Iceland
Years of the 20th century in Iceland